Benjamin Sprague Cowen (September 27, 1793 – September 27, 1869) was a U.S. Representative from Ohio.

Life 
Born in Washington County, New York, Cowen attended the common schools, and later studied medicine.  He served in the War of 1812 as a private.  In 1820, he moved to Moorefield Township, Harrison County, Ohio, where he practiced medicine and studied law.  He was admitted to the bar in 1829 and commenced practice in St. Clairsville, Ohio.  He edited the Belmont Chronicle 1836–1840, and served as delegate to the Whig National Convention at Harrisburg, Pennsylvania, in 1839.

Cowen was elected as a Whig to the Twenty-seventh Congress (March 4, 1841 – March 4, 1843).  He served as a member of the Ohio House of Representatives in 1845 and 1846, and as presiding judge of the Court of Common Pleas in 1847.

In 1854, he was on the nominating committee of the Republican Party, representing Belmont County.

He died in St. Clairsville, Belmont County, Ohio, September 27, 1869.  His obituary was published in the September 30, 1869 edition of the Belmont Chronicle.

Family 
Cowen was married to Anne Wood (1794–1865) of Washington County, New York in 1820.

He was the father of American Civil War Union Army General Benjamin Rush Cowen.

Notes

References

1793 births
1860 deaths
People from St. Clairsville, Ohio
19th-century American newspaper editors
United States Army personnel of the War of 1812
People from Washington County, New York
Members of the Ohio House of Representatives
Ohio state court judges
United States Army soldiers
Physicians from Ohio
Whig Party members of the United States House of Representatives from Ohio
19th-century American politicians
19th-century American judges